My Gym Partner's a Monkey is an American animated television series created by Julie McNally-Cahill and Timothy Cahill (the latter is also the director of all episodes) for Cartoon Network. The series first aired on December 26, 2005 as a sneak peek during Cartoon Network's "Sneak Peek Week" block, airing alongside fellow Cartoon Network original series Ben 10, Cartoon Network European co-production Robotboy, and acquired Canadian  YTV series Zixx. The series officially premiered on February 24, 2006. The series aired for a total of four seasons and 56 episodes (not including shorts).

Series overview

Episodes

Pilot (2003)
My Gym Partner's a Monkey had one pilot created for Cartoon Network by Julie and Timothy Cahill, one made in late 2003 shared the same name of the TV series.

Season 1 (2005–06)

Season 2 (2006–07)

Season 3 (2007)
Seasons 3 and 4 are the longest seasons in terms of half hour episodes, with a total of 15 of them. They also both also consist a TV movie. This season is the longest season in terms of episode segments, with a total of 26. It also contains a half-hour special like the previous two seasons.

Season 4 (2007–08)
This season is the shortest season in terms of episode segments, with a total of 24 of them. It also contains three half-hour specials, witch also makes it the only season with more than one half-hour special.

Shorts (2006–08)

Lists of Cartoon Network television series episodes
Lists of American children's animated television series episodes